The first round of the women's team pursuit of the 2010–11 UCI Track Cycling World Cup Classics took place in Melbourne, Australia on 2 December 2010. 17 teams participated in the contest.

Competition format
The women's team pursuit race consists of a 3 km race between two teams of three cyclists, starting on opposite sides of the track.  If one team catches the other, the race is over.

The tournament consisted of an initial qualifying round. The top two teams in the qualifying round advanced to the gold medal match and the third and fourth teams advanced to the bronze medal race.

Schedule
Thursday 2 December14:50-16:30 Qualifying19:51-20:06 Finals20:16-20:24 Victory Ceremony

Schedule from Tissottiming.com

Results

Qualifying

Results from Tissottiming.com.

Finals

Final bronze medal race

Final gold medal race

Results from Tissottiming.com.

References

UCI
UCI Track Cycling World Cup – Women's team pursuit
2010–11 UCI Track Cycling World Cup Classics